The Root River is a  river that flows to Lake Michigan at the city of Racine in southeastern Wisconsin in the United States.  Racine and Racine County are named for the river, as racine is the French word for root.

Course
The Root River rises in the Waukesha County suburb of New Berlin and flows generally southeastwardly through the Milwaukee County suburbs of West Allis, Greenfield, Greendale and Franklin, into Racine County, where it enters Lake Michigan at Racine.

Variant names
According to the Geographic Names Information System, the Root River has also been known historically as:
Chippecotton
Chipperooton
Kipikawi
Ot-chee-beek
Racine River

There was at one time a hamlet in Greenfield called Root Creek on the bank of what was locally called "Root Creek" rather than "Root River".

See also
List of Wisconsin rivers
List of Wisconsin county name etymologies
List of U.S. counties named after rivers

References

External links

Columbia Gazetteer of North America entry
DeLorme (1992).  Wisconsin Atlas & Gazetteer.  Freeport, Maine: DeLorme.  .

Rivers of Wisconsin
Milwaukee metropolitan area
Rivers of Milwaukee County, Wisconsin
Rivers of Racine County, Wisconsin
Rivers of Waukesha County, Wisconsin